Route 338 is a provincial highway located in the Montérégie region of Quebec west of Montreal. The highway runs from the Ontario Border near Rivière-Beaudette as a continuation of Stormont, Dundas and Glengarry County Road 2 and ends at Vaudreuil-Dorion at the junction of Autoroute 20 which the 338 acts as an alternate and service route parallel to A-20 although through several villages along the Saint Lawrence River. Before the 1970s, this road was named "Route 2", as part of an interprovincial Route 2 that stretched from Windsor, Ontario to Halifax, Nova Scotia.

Municipalities along Route 338
 Rivière-Beaudette
 Saint-Zotique
 Les Coteaux
 Coteau-du-Lac
 Les Cèdres
 Pointe-des-Cascades
 Vaudreuil-Dorion

Major intersections

See also
 List of Quebec provincial highways

References

External links 
 Transports Quebec Official Map 
 Route 338 on Google Maps

338